The Jazz Boy (Swedish: Jazzgossen) is a 1958 Swedish musical film directed by Hasse Ekman and starring Ekman, Maj-Britt Nilsson, Elof Ahrle and Georg Funkquist. The film was an attempt to make a nostalgical cavalcade of the Swedish entertainment scene of the 1920s and 1930s, and featured many songs from that era. The film's sets were designed by the art director P.A. Lundgren.

Cast 
Maj-Britt Nilsson as Karin Ingel-Anker
Hasse Ekman as Teddy Anker
Elof Ahrle as Mille Bergström
Bengt Ekerot as Erik Jonsson
Georg Funkquist as Allan Örtengren
Per Lindquist as Lars-Erik
Meg Westergren as Madeleine
Torsten Lilliecrona as Guest at Teddy's party
Curt Masreliez as Hubbe
Einar Fagstad as himself
Wiktor Andersson as Stage Guard
Ingvar Kjellson as Guest at Teddy's party
Hans Strååt as The Director of 'Kameliadamen'
Ragnar Klange as Visitor at auction
Rune Halvarsson
Elsa Ebbesen as Svea
Gunnar Olsson as Film director
Börje Nyberg as Sound engineer
Gösta Prüzelius as Film editor
Ulf Johansson as Lightmaster at China
Sven-Axel Carlsson as Electrician at China
Per Sjöstrand as Armand
Håkan Serner as Messenger
Göthe Grefbo as Publicity Manager
Sune Mangs as Jerka
Alf Östlund as Jazzgosse
Mille Schmidt as Jazzgosse
Ulla-Carin Rydén as Ms. Holm
Karl Gerhard as himself
Sigge Fürst as Ernst Rolf
Sven Jerring (voice)
Gunnar Skoglund as himself (voice)
Manne Berggren as himself (voice)
Gunnar 'Knas' Lindkvist as Jazzgosse
 Anita Lindblom as 	Lily
 Wilma Malmlöf as 	Tekla,
Zarah Leander and Einar Söderbäck appear uncredited.

Soundtrack 
Zarah Leander - "Hela Livet är en Glad Operett" (Music by Jules Sylvain, lyrics by Åke Söderblom)
Karl Gerhard - "Jazzgossen (En lille Rystedans)" (Composed by Edvard Brink, lyrics by Karl-Gerhard)
Sigge Fürst and Einar Fagstad - "Från Frisco till Kap eller Alla jäntor ä lika" (Composed by Ernst Rolf, lyrics by Martin Nilsson)
Maj Lindström - "I min blommiga blå krinolin" (In My Sweet Little Alice Blue Gown) (Composed by Harry Tierney, lyrics by Anita Halldén as S.S. Wilson)
"Shimmy"
Sigge Fürst and choir - "Bättre och bättre dag för dag" (I'm Getting Better Every Day) (Composed by Mark Strong lyrics by Anita Halldén as S.S. Wilson and Karl-Ewert Christenson)
Maj Lindström and Per Lindquist - "Säg det i toner" (Composed by Jules Sylvain, lyrics by Karl-Ewert Christenson)
Helge Lindberg - "De' ä' grabben me' chokla' i"
Sigge Fürst - "Din vår är min vår" (Composed by Georg Enders)
Karl-Gerhard - "Hurra för det lilla som är kvar" (Composed by Carl Gustaf Hulthe, lyrics by Karl-Gerhard)
Karl-Gerhard - "Den ökända hästen från Troja" (Mars vesiolych rebjat) (Composed by Isaak Dunayevsky, lyrics by Karl-Gerhard, arrangement by Lille Bror Söderlundh)
Maj-Britt Nilsson - "Min Soldat" (Written by Nils Perne)
"Calle Schewens vals" (Composed by Evert Taube, original lyrics by Evert Taube, new lyrics by Karl-Gerhard)
Alice Babs - "Swing it Magistern"

References

Bibliography 
 Gustafsson, Fredrik. The Man from the Third Row: Hasse Ekman, Swedish Cinema and the Long Shadow of Ingmar Bergman. Berghahn Books, 2016.

External links 

Jazzgossen on Swedish Film Database

1958 films
Films directed by Hasse Ekman
Films set in the 1920s
Films set in the 1930s
1950s musical drama films
1950s Swedish-language films
Swedish musical drama films
1958 drama films
1950s Swedish films